Brendan Smith (born February 8, 1989) is a Canadian professional ice hockey defenceman for the New Jersey Devils of the National Hockey League (NHL). Although he is listed as a defenceman, Smith is a versatile player who can also play forward. Smith was drafted 27th overall by the Detroit Red Wings in the 2007 NHL Entry Draft and was previously a finalist for the Hobey Baker Award.

Playing career

Prior to the 2007 Draft, Smith was a member of the Ontario Provincial Junior A Hockey League's St. Michael's Buzzers. In 2007, he finished his second season with St. Michael's leading all defencemen in points with 36. Smith was selected to participate in the CJAHL All-Star Game in 2006. Smith played for Canada East at the World Junior A Challenge 2006, helping his team win silver. Smith played three seasons for the University of Wisconsin–Madison before he signed a three-year entry-level contract with the Detroit Red Wings, on May 27, 2010. Smith made his NHL debut on November 17, 2011, against the San Jose Sharks. Smith was called up on February 27, 2012, to replace Mike Commodore, who had been traded to the Tampa Bay Lightning on the same day. He scored his first NHL goal against Josh Harding of the Minnesota Wild at the Joe Louis Arena on March 2, 2012.

Smith appeared in 34 games for Detroit during the lock-out shortened 2012–13 NHL season. He would score his first career Stanley Cup playoff goal on May 6, 2013, during game four of Detroit's Western Conference quarterfinal series against the Anaheim Ducks.

On July 16, 2013, the Detroit Red Wings re-signed Smith to a two-year, $2.525 million contract. On June 30, 2015, the Red Wings re-signed Smith to a two-year, $5.5 million contract.

During the final year of his contract and approaching free agency in the 2016–17 season, Smith was traded to the New York Rangers in exchange for a third-round pick in the 2017 NHL Entry Draft and a second-round pick in the 2018 NHL Entry Draft on February 28, 2017. Smith provided a stability to the Rangers blueline to finish the season with 4 points in 18 games.

On June 29, 2017, Smith agreed to forfeit his impending free agent status in signing to a four-year, $17.4 million contract to remain with the Rangers. On Smith reportedly showed up to 2017 training camp out of shape, and the Rangers as a team struggled. On February 8, 2018, the Rangers placed Smith on waivers due to his struggling play, and then assigned him to their AHL affiliate, the Hartford Wolf Pack after he went unclaimed. Shortly after arriving in Hartford, Smith broke his hand in a fight with teammate Vinni Lettieri during a practice, ending his season.

In the 2018 season, under new head coach David Quinn, Smith saw an improved play and fewer penalties with reduced ice time. In an effort to keep Smith in the lineup despite a crowded blue-line, Quinn dressed him as a forward several times throughout the season. Smith had previously played forward briefly while in juniors.

After five seasons within the Rangers organization, Smith left as a free agent and on July 29, 2021, he was signed to a one-year, $800,000 contract with the Carolina Hurricanes.

Smith left the Hurricanes at the conclusion of his contract and was signed to a two-year, $2.2 million contract with the New Jersey Devils on July 13, 2022.

Personal life
Smith was born and raised in Etobicoke, Ontario with his parents Deidre and Lester and his two brothers, Rory and Reilly. The three all played minor hockey in the Mimico neighbourhood with the Faustina Sports Club, then all played for the St. Michael's Buzzers minor juniors. He faced his brother Reilly in the first round of the 2014 Stanley Cup playoffs when his Red Wings faced Reilly's Boston Bruins.

Smith and his wife Samantha have a son and daughter together.

Career statistics

Regular season and playoffs

International

Awards and honours

References

External links

1989 births
Living people
Canadian ice hockey defencemen
Carolina Hurricanes players
Detroit Red Wings draft picks
Detroit Red Wings players
Grand Rapids Griffins players
Hartford Wolf Pack players
National Hockey League first-round draft picks
New Jersey Devils players
New York Rangers players
Sportspeople from Etobicoke
Ice hockey people from Toronto
Wisconsin Badgers men's ice hockey players
AHCA Division I men's ice hockey All-Americans